Oscar Charles Parkinson served in the California State Assembly for the 20th district from 1921 to 1923. During World War I, he served in the United States Army. He was elected to California's 20th State Assembly district in 1920.

References

United States Army personnel of World War I
Republican Party members of the California State Assembly
1891 births
1972 deaths
People from Colusa, California